Benthodaphne is a genus of sea snails, marine gastropod mollusks in the family Pseudomelatomidae,.

Description
The shell is rather small and resembles Antiplanes or Spirotropis, except for the growth lines. The rather flat whorls are smooth save fine growth lines such as in Daphnella.

Distribution
This marine genus is found off Japan.

Species
 Benthodaphne yukiae (Shikama, 1962) (considered provisionally as a synonym of Antiplanes yukiae)

References

 Taylor, J.D., Kantor, Y.I. & Sysoev, A.V. (1993). Foregut anatomy, feeding mechanisms, relationships and classification of the Conoidea (=Toxoglossa) (Gastropoda). Bulletin of the British Museum (Natural History), Zoology. 59 : 125-170

External links
 Bouchet, P.; Kantor, Y. I.; Sysoev, A.; Puillandre, N. (2011). A new operational classification of the Conoidea (Gastropoda). Journal of Molluscan Studies. 77(3): 273-308
 Worldwide Mollusc Species Data Base: Pseudomelatomidae

Pseudomelatomidae